Padmakar Chury (9 June 1909 – 19 May 1970) was an Indian cricketer. He played in the final of the 1934–35 Ranji Trophy for Bombay.

References

External links
 

1909 births
1970 deaths
Indian cricketers
Hindus cricketers
Mumbai cricketers
Cricketers from Mumbai